Dicellitis cornucopiae is a species of moth of the family Tortricidae. It is found on the Maluku Islands of Indonesia.

References

Moths described in 1941
Archipini